Gazin (also Romanized as Gazīn; also known as Gūgerd) is a village in Gazin Rural District, Raghiveh District, Haftgel County, Khuzestan Province, Iran. At the 2006 census, its population was 322, in 68 families.

References 

Populated places in Haftkel County